Philippe Ghanem (born 4 October 1980), a Swiss national, is a ‘C’ suite executive who is seen as an innovator and visionary in global financial markets. As an investor and an expert in trading a range of asset classes, he has developed a reputation for building financial services companies based on his insight and understanding of trading systems. He and how these are driven by changes in market conditions, regulation and technology.

Well-defined people management skills gained from 15 years of senior leadership and high-level management roles, with responsibility for over 300 employees across multiple international regulatory environments. He has a track record of building and maintaining the performance of teams to achieve financial and commercial goals. He has developed and launched a number of retail and institutional trading firms including the Abu Dhabi-based ADSS Group, where he was CEO and vice-chairman.  It was announced on 25 June 2019 that at the start of the year he had expressed his desire to leave the organisation to pursue the development of a new entrepreneurial project. Since then, Philippe Ghanem has been the Executive Chairman of SquaredFinancial.

Career
In 2005, Philippe Ghanem and Georges Cohen co-founded the Dublin-based Squared Financial Services Limited. In February 2011, Ghanem was appointed managing director of ADS Securities. The firm rebranded to ADSS in June 2018. when he held the roles of CEO of ADSS and vice chairman of ADSS Group, ADSS' parent company.  His departure from ADSS was announced on 25 June 2019.

In 2020, Philippe Ghanem returns to SquaredFinancial  to take the company through the next stage of its development. In 2021, SquaredFinancial reports a 266% growth in its volumes, along with a 200% increase in gross profits. The massive surges in volumes and profits have resulted from a spike in the client base of the broker that saw a growth of 220% in the quarter.

Ghanem was a featured speaker at the Forbes Global CEO Conference, held in Kuala Lumpur, Malaysia, in September 2011 and at London's Abu Dhabi Investment Forum in October 2012. He is a regular contributor to international business media including as a guest host on CNBC Europe's Squawk Box program. Ghanem was profiled by The Banker Middle East, an international financial news magazine, in November 2016.

He is known for his expertise in managing the development of low latency multi-asset trading platforms, using Artificial Intelligence (AI) systems to increase returns and implementing blockchain technology as a way of developing new trading models.  He is also known for the introduction of blockchain trading systems and cryptocurrency into the GCC region.  His approach has been covered on CNBC.

Personal life 
Ghanem received his Bachelor of Science in business administration from the International University in Geneva in 2002. Ghanem was born in Switzerland and lives in Geneva.  On 20 June the Monaco Sport Academy announced a new collaboration with the Yacht Club de Monaco.  The initiative is presided over by Prince Albert II of Monaco, its general secretary Bernard d'Alessandri and Philippe Ghanem.  Ghanem is fluent in English, French and Arabic.<ref>

References

Further reading
Philippe Ghanem talking about the Middle Eastern perspective
Finance Magnates Philippe Ghanem interview
 VIP Interview Philippe Ghanem

Living people
1980 births
Businesspeople from Geneva